The 1951 World Table Tennis Championships men's singles was the 18th edition of the men's singles championship. 

Johnny Leach defeated Ivan Andreadis in the final, winning three sets to one to secure the title.

Results

+ Time limit rule applied

See also
List of World Table Tennis Championships medalists

References

-